The 1984 United States presidential election was the 50th quadrennial presidential election. It was held on Tuesday, November 6, 1984. Incumbent Republican president Ronald Reagan defeated Democratic former vice president Walter Mondale in a landslide, winning 525 electoral votes and 58.8 percent of the popular vote. No other candidate in history has matched Reagan's electoral vote total. This is the most recent U.S. presidential election in which a candidate received over 500 electoral votes and the last time that a major party candidate failed to carry more than 100 electoral votes. This is also the most recent election in which both candidates are deceased and the last to feature a non-incumbent vice president until 2020, which saw Joe Biden win the presidency four years after leaving the vice-presidential office.

Reagan and Vice President George H. W. Bush faced only token opposition in their bid for re-nomination. Mondale faced a competitive field in his bid, defeating Senator Gary Hart of Colorado, activist Jesse Jackson and several other candidates in the 1984 Democratic primaries. He eventually chose U.S. Representative Geraldine Ferraro of New York as his running mate, the first woman to be on a major party's presidential ticket.

Reagan touted a strong economic recovery from the 1970s stagflation and the 1981–1982 recession, as well as the widespread perception that his presidency had overseen a revival of national confidence and prestige. At 73, Reagan was, at the time, the oldest person ever to be nominated by a major party for president until the nominations of Trump and Biden in 2020. The Reagan campaign produced effective television advertising and deftly neutralized concerns regarding Reagan's age. Mondale criticized Reagan's supply-side economic policies and budget deficits and he called for a nuclear freeze and ratification of the Equal Rights Amendment.

Reagan won a landslide re-election victory, carrying 49 of the 50 states, making this the second election in the twentieth century in which a party won 49 states (after the 1972 election). Mondale won only his home state of Minnesota with a 0.18% margin of victory, and the District of Columbia. In addition, Reagan's 54,455,075 votes set a record for the most ever received by a presidential candidate until it was broken by both major-party candidates 20 years later in a high turnout election.

Reagan won 525 of the 538 electoral votes, the most of any presidential candidate in U.S. history. In terms of electoral votes, this was the second-most lopsided presidential election in modern U.S. history; Franklin D. Roosevelt's 1936 victory over Alf Landon, in which he won 98.5 percent or 523 of the then-total 531 electoral votes, ranks first. His popular vote margin of victory—nearly 16.9 million votes (54.4 million for Reagan to 37.5 million for Mondale)—was exceeded only by Richard Nixon in his 1972 victory over George McGovern, and Reagan is the most recent presidential candidate, as of 2022, to win the popular vote by a margin of greater than 10 million votes and by a margin of greater than 10%. Reagan was also the first president since Dwight D. Eisenhower to be re-elected while winning absolute popular vote majorities in both of his presidential campaigns and was the first presidential candidate in history to win more than 50 million votes. Reagan's raw vote total would stand as the largest number of votes received in a presidential election until 2004.

Reagan, at 73 years old, would be the oldest winner of a presidential election until Biden won the 2020 election at the age of 77. As of 2020, no Republican candidate has since won New York, Washington, Massachusetts, Oregon, Hawaii, or Rhode Island. West Virginia would not vote Republican again until 2000, while Iowa would not until 2004. This would also be the last time Wisconsin voted for a Republican candidate until 2016. Until 2008, this would be the last election in which both the presidential and vice presidential nominee would end up serving into the presidency.

Nominations

Republican Party candidates 

 Ronald Reagan, President of the United States
 Ben Fernandez, former Special Ambassador to Paraguay from California
 Harold Stassen, former Governor of Minnesota

Primaries 

Reagan was the assured nominee for the Republican Party, with only token opposition. The popular vote from the Republican primaries was as follows:
 Ronald Reagan (inc.): 6,484,987 (98.6%)
 Unpledged delegates: 41,411 (0.6%)
 Others: 21,643 (0.3%)
 "Ronald Reagan No": 14,047 (0.2%)
 Harold E. Stassen: 12,749 (0.2%)
 David Kelly: 360
 Gary Arnold: 252
 Benjamin Fernandez: 202

Reagan was renominated by a vote of 2,233 delegates (two delegates abstained). For the only time in American history, the vice presidential roll call was taken concurrently with the presidential roll call. Vice President George H. W. Bush was overwhelmingly renominated. This was the last time in the 20th century that the vice-presidential candidate of either major party was nominated by roll call vote.

Democratic Party candidates 

 Walter Mondale, former Vice President and former U.S. senator from Minnesota
 Reubin Askew, former governor of Florida
 Alan Cranston, U.S. senator from California
 John Glenn, U.S. senator from Ohio and former NASA astronaut
 Gary Hart, U.S. senator from Colorado
 Ernest Hollings, U.S. senator from South Carolina
 Jesse Jackson, clergyman and civil rights activist from Illinois
 George McGovern, former U.S. senator and 1972 Democratic nominee from South Dakota

Primaries 

Only three Democratic candidates won any state primaries: Mondale, Hart, and Jackson. Initially, Massachusetts Senator Ted Kennedy, after a failed bid to win the 1980 Democratic nomination for president, was considered the de facto front-runner of the 1984 primary. However, Kennedy announced in December 1982 that he did not intend to run. Former Vice President Mondale was then viewed as the favorite to win the Democratic nomination. Mondale had the largest number of party leaders supporting him, and he had raised more money than any other candidate. However, both Jackson and Hart emerged as surprising, and troublesome, opponents.

South Carolina Senator Ernest Hollings's wit and experience, as well as his call for a budget freeze, won him some positive attention, but his relatively conservative record alienated liberal Democrats, and he was never really noticed in a field dominated by Mondale, John Glenn, and Gary Hart. Hollings dropped out two days after losing badly in New Hampshire and endorsed Hart a week later. His disdain for his competitors was at times showcased in his comments. He notably referred to Mondale as a "lapdog", and to former astronaut Glenn as "Sky King" who was "confused in his capsule."

California Senator Alan Cranston hoped to galvanize supporters of the nuclear freeze movement that had called on the United States to halt the deployment of existing nuclear weapons and the development of new ones. Glenn and Askew hoped to capture the support of moderate and conservative Democrats. None of them possessed the fundraising ability of Mondale nor the grassroots support of Hart and Jackson, and none won any contests.

Jackson was the second African-American (after Shirley Chisholm) to mount a nationwide campaign for the presidency, and he was the first African-American candidate to be a serious contender. He got 3.5 million votes during the primaries, third behind Hart and Mondale. He won the primaries in Virginia, South Carolina, and Louisiana, and split Mississippi, where there were two separate contests for Democratic delegates. Through the primaries, Jackson helped confirm the black electorate's importance to the Democratic Party in the South at the time. During the campaign, however, Jackson made an off-the-cuff reference to Jews as "Hymies" and New York City as "Hymietown", for which he later apologized. Nonetheless, the remark was widely publicized, and derailed his campaign for the nomination. Jackson ended up winning 21% of the national primary vote but received only 8% of the delegates to the national convention, and he initially charged that his campaign was hurt by the same party rules that allowed Mondale to win. He also poured scorn on Mondale, saying that Hubert Humphrey was the "last significant politician out of the St. Paul-Minneapolis" area.

Hart, from Colorado, was a more serious threat to Mondale, and after winning several early primaries it looked as if he might take the nomination away from Mondale. Hart finished a surprising second in the Iowa caucuses, with 16.5% of the vote. This established him as the main rival to Mondale, effectively eliminating John Glenn, Ernest Hollings and Alan Cranston as alternatives. Hart criticized Mondale as an "old-fashioned" Great Society Democrat who symbolized "failed policies" of the past. Hart positioned himself (just as Bill Clinton would eight years later) as a younger, fresher, and more moderate Democrat who could appeal to younger voters. He emerged as a formidable candidate, winning the key New Hampshire, Ohio, and California primaries as well as several others, especially in the West. However, Hart could not overcome Mondale's financial and organizational advantages, especially among labor union leaders in the Midwest and industrial Northeast.

Hart was also badly hurt in a televised debate with Mondale during the primaries, when the former vice president used a popular television commercial slogan to ridicule Hart's vague "New Ideas" platform. Turning to Hart on camera, Mondale told Hart that whenever he heard Hart talk about his "New Ideas", he was reminded of the Wendy's fast-food slogan "Where's the beef?" The remark drew loud laughter and applause from the viewing audience and caught Hart off-guard. Hart never fully recovered from Mondale's charge that his "New Ideas" were shallow and lacking in specifics.

At a roundtable debate between the three remaining Democratic candidates moderated by Phil Donahue, Mondale and Hart got into such a heated argument over the issue of U.S. policy in Central America that Jackson had to tap his water glass on the table to help get them to stop.

Mondale gradually pulled away from Hart in the delegate count, but, as Time reported in late May, "Mondale ... has a wide lead in total delegates (1,564 to 941) ... because of his victories in the big industrial states, his support from the Democratic Establishment and the arcane provisions of delegate-selection rules that his vanguard helped draft two years ago." After the final primary in California, on June 5, which Hart won, Mondale was about 40 delegates short of the total he needed for the nomination. However, at the Democratic National Convention in San Francisco on July 16, Mondale received the overwhelming support of the unelected superdelegates from the party establishment to win the nomination.

Mondale's nomination marked the second time since the nomination of former governor of Georgia Jimmy Carter in 1976 and the fourth time since the nomination of former Representative John W. Davis in 1924 that the Democratic Party nominated a private citizen for president (not serving in an official government role at the time of the nomination and election). Mondale was the last private citizen to be nominated for president by the Democratic Party until former Secretary of State Hillary Clinton in 2016. He was also the last former vice president to be nominated for president by the Democratic Party after leaving office until Joe Biden in 2020.

This race for the Democratic Party presidential nomination was the closest in two generations, and, as of 2020, it was the last occasion that a major party's race for the presidential nomination went all the way to its convention.

Endorsements 
Note: These are only those endorsements which occurred during or before the primary race.

Mondale had received endorsements from:
United States House of Representatives
 Representative Jim Bates of California
 Representative Edward Boland of Massachusetts
 Representative Rick Boucher of Virginia
 Representative Joseph D. Early of Massachusetts
 Representative Barney Frank of Massachusetts
 Representative Robert García of New York
 Representative Sam Gejdenson of Connecticut
 Representative Tom Harkin of Iowa
 Representative Joe Moakley of Massachusetts
 Representative Charles B. Rangel of New York
 Representative William R. Ratchford of Connecticut
 Representative James Michael Shannon of Massachusetts
Governors and State Constitutional officers
 New York Attorney General Robert Abrams
 Governor Mario Cuomo of New York
 Lieutenant Governor Zell Miller of Georgia
Former officeholders
 Former President Jimmy Carter of Georgia
Former diplomats, board members and other officials
 Former Secretary of State Dean Rusk of Georgia
Organizations and unions
 AFL–CIO
 Alabama Democratic Conference
 National Education Association
 National Organization for Women
Current and former state and local officials and party officeholders
Alabama
 Mayor Richard Arrington, Jr. of Birmingham
California
 Mayor and 1982 Democratic Gubernatorial nominee Tom Bradley of Los Angeles
Georgia
 State Senator Julian Bond
Illinois
 Former Alderman, President of the City Council, 1983 mayoral candidate, and Cook County Democratic Party Chairman Edward Vrdolyak of Chicago
Michigan
 Mayor Coleman Young of Detroit

Hart had received endorsements from:
United States House of Representatives
 Representative Patricia Schroeder of Colorado
 Representative Chuck Schumer of New York
 Representative and 1976 Democratic presidential candidate Mo Udall of Arizona
 Representative Henry A. Waxman of California
Celebrities, political activists, and political commentators
 Actor and director Warren Beatty

Jackson had received endorsements from:
United States House of Representatives
 Delegate Walter E. Fauntroy of Washington, D.C.
Former officeholders
 Former Representative and 1972 Democratic presidential candidate Shirley Chisholm of New York
 Former Governor Orval E. Faubus of Arkansas
Current and former state and local officials and party officeholders
Alabama
 State Senator Michael Figures
 Mayor Johnny Ford of Tuskegee
 State Senator Earl Hilliard
 State Senator Hank Sanders
Georgia
 State Representative Tyrone Brookes
Illinois
 Mayor Carl Officer of East St. Louis
Indiana
 Mayor Richard G. Hatcher of Gary
Washington, D.C.
 Mayor Marion Barry of Washington, D.C.
Organizations and unions
 Church of God in Christ
 Nation of Islam
 National Baptist Convention of America, Inc.
 National Baptist Convention, USA, Inc.
 National Farmers Alliance
 National Hispanic Leadership Conference
Celebrities, political activists, and political commentators
 Muhammad Ali
 1980 presidential nominee of the Citizens Party Barry Commoner

Hollings had received endorsements from:
United States Senate
 Former U.S. Senator Birch Bayh of Indiana
 Former U.S. Senator William B. Spong, Jr. of Virginia
State Constitutional officers
 Lieutenant Governor Martha Griffiths of Michigan
 State Senator Anna Belle Clement O'Brien of Tennessee
 Lieutenant Governor Nancy Stevenson of South Carolina

Glenn had received endorsements from:
United States Senate
 Senator Sam Nunn of Georgia
 Senator Jim Sasser of Tennessee
 Senator Paul Tsongas of Massachusetts
United States House of Representatives
 Representative Jerry Huckaby of Louisiana
Governors and State Constitutional officers
 Lieutenant Governor Bill Baxley of Alabama
 Governor Chuck Robb of Virginia
Current and former state and local officials and party officeholders
Georgia
 Commissioner of Agriculture Tommy Irvin
Texas
 State Representative Larry Walker
Celebrities
 Actor and director Warren Beatty

Cranston had received endorsements from:
United States House of Representatives
 Representative William Lehman of Florida

Askew had received endorsements from:
United States Senate
 Senator Lawton Chiles of Florida
United States House of Representatives
 Representative William V. Chappell, Jr. of Florida
 Representative Dante Fascell of Florida
 Representative Sam Gibbons of Florida
 Representative Dan Mica of Florida
Governors and State Constitutional officers
 Governor Bob Graham of Florida
Current and former state and local officials and party officeholders
Florida
 Mayor Eva Mack of West Palm Beach

Convention 
This was the convention's nomination tally:

When he made his acceptance speech at the Democratic Convention, Mondale said: "Let's tell the truth. Mr. Reagan will raise taxes, and so will I. He won't tell you. I just did." Although Mondale intended to expose Reagan as hypocritical and position himself as the honest candidate, the choice of raising taxes as a discussion point likely damaged his electoral chances.

Vice presidential nominee 

Mondale wanted to establish a highly visible precedent with his vice presidential candidate. Mondale chose U.S. Rep. Geraldine A. Ferraro from New York as his running mate, making her the first woman and the first Catholic nominated for that position by a major party. Another reason for the nominee to "go for broke" instead of balancing the ticket was Reagan's lead in the polls. Mondale hoped to appeal to women, and by 1980, they were the majority of voters. In a "much criticized parade of possible Veep candidates" to his home in Minnesota, Mondale considered San Francisco Mayor Dianne Feinstein and Kentucky Governor Martha Layne Collins, also female; Los Angeles Mayor Tom Bradley, an African American; and San Antonio Mayor Henry Cisneros, a Hispanic, as other finalists for the nomination. In addition to her sex, Mondale chose Ferraro because he hoped she would attract ethnic voters with her personal background. Unsuccessful nomination candidate Jesse Jackson derided Mondale's vice-presidential screening process as a "P.R. parade of personalities", but praised Mondale for his choice, having himself pledged to name a woman to the ticket in the event he was nominated.

Mondale had wanted to choose New York Governor Mario Cuomo as his running mate, but Cuomo declined and recommended Ferraro, his protégée. Mondale might have named Massachusetts Governor Michael Dukakis as his running mate had he wanted to make a "safe" choice", while others preferred Senator Lloyd Bentsen because he would appeal to more conservative Southern voters. Nomination rival Gary Hart stated before Ferraro's selection that he would accept an invitation to run with Mondale; Hart's supporters claimed he would do better than Mondale against President Reagan, an argument undercut by a June 1984 Gallup poll that showed both men nine points behind the president.

Other parties

National Unity Party nomination 
Sources:

The National Unity Party was an outgrowth of John Anderson's presidential campaign from the 1980 presidential election. Anderson hoped that the party would be able to challenge the "two old parties", which he viewed as being tied to various special interest groups and incapable of responsible fiscal reform. The intention was to organize the new party in California, Oregon, Washington, Illinois, the New England states, and others where his previous candidacy had proven to have experienced the most success. The party was also eligible for $5.8 million in Federal election funds, but its qualification depended on it being on the ballot in at least ten states; however, it remained unclear if National Unity could actually obtain the funds, or if it needed to be Anderson himself.

Anderson initially was against running, hoping that another notable politico would take the party into the 1984 election, and feared that his own candidacy might result in the party being labeled a "personality cult". However, no candidate came forward resulting in Anderson becoming the nominee in waiting. While Anderson had found equal support from the Republicans and Democrats in the 1980 election, the grand majority of the former had since switched back, resulting in the new party being supported principally by those who normally would vote Democratic, which it was feared might make him a spoiler candidate. In light of this, in addition to difficulties in getting on the ballot in his targeted states (Utah and Kentucky were the only two, neither among those he intended to prominently campaign in), Anderson ultimately declined to run. Later he would endorse the Democratic nominee, Walter Mondale.

Anderson had hoped that the party would continue to grow and later field a candidate in 1988 (which he declared would not be him), but it floundered and ultimately dissolved.

Libertarian Party nomination 
 David Bergland, Party Chairman from California
 Gene Burns, talk radio host from Florida (withdrew – August 26, 1983)
 Tonie Nathan, 1972 vice presidential nominee from Oregon (declined to contest)
 Earl Ravenal, foreign policy analyst, academic, and writer from Washington, D.C.
 Mary Ruwart, research scientist from Texas

Burns was the initial frontrunner for the nomination, but withdrew, citing concerns that the party would not be able to properly finance a campaign. The remaining candidates were Bergland; Ravenal, who had worked in the Department of Defense under Robert McNamara and Clark Clifford; and Ruwart. Bergland narrowly won the presidential nomination over Ravenal. His running mate was James A. Lewis. The ticket appeared on 39 state ballots.

Citizens Party nomination 
Sonia Johnson ran in the 1984 presidential election, as the presidential candidate of the Citizens Party, Pennsylvania's Consumer Party and California's Peace and Freedom Party. Johnson received 72,161 votes (0.1%) finishing fifth. Her running mate for the Citizens Party was Richard Walton and for the Peace and Freedom Party Emma Wong Mar. One of her campaign managers, Mark Dunlea, later wrote a novel about a first female president, Madame President.

Communist Party nomination 
The Communist Party USA ran Gus Hall for president and Angela Davis for vice president.

General election

Campaign 

Mondale ran a liberal campaign, supporting a nuclear freeze and the Equal Rights Amendment (ERA). He spoke against what he considered to be unfairness in Reagan's economic policies and the need to reduce federal budget deficits.

While Ferraro's choice was popular among Democratic activists, polls immediately after the announcement showed that only 22% of women were pleased about her selection, versus 18% who agreed that it was a bad idea. 60% of all voters thought that pressure from women's groups had led to Mondale's decision, versus 22% who believed that he had chosen the best available candidate. Some members of the hierarchy of the Roman Catholic Church criticized the Catholic Ferraro for being pro-choice on abortion. Already fighting an uphill battle with voters, Ferraro also faced a slew of allegations, mid-campaign, directed toward her husband, John Zaccaro. These allegations included Zaccaro's possible past involvement in organized crime, pornography distribution, and campaign contribution violations. Ferraro responded to these allegations against her husband by releasing her family tax returns to the media on August 21, 1984. However, the damage to the campaign was already done.

At a campaign stop in Hammonton, New Jersey, Reagan said, "America's future rests in a thousand dreams inside your hearts. It rests in the message of hope in songs of a man so many young Americans admire, New Jersey's Bruce Springsteen." The Reagan campaign briefly used "Born in the U.S.A.", a song criticizing the treatment of Vietnam War veterans (which they mistakenly thought was devoid of anti-war content and a very jingoistic patriotic rock song), as a campaign song, without permission, until Springsteen, a lifelong Democrat, insisted that they stop. Two of the more memorable Reagan campaign ads were commonly known as "Morning in America" and, after the difficult first debate for the president, "Bear in the woods".

Reagan was the oldest president to have served to that time (at 73) and there were questions about his capacity to endure the grueling demands of the presidency, particularly after Reagan had a poor showing in the first 1984 United States presidential debates with Mondale on October 7. He referred to having started going to church "here in Washington", although the debate was in Louisville, Kentucky, referred to military uniforms as "wardrobe", and admitted to being "confused", among other mistakes. In the next debate on October 21, however, in response to a question from journalist Henry Trewhitt about his age, Reagan joked, "I will not make age an issue of this campaign. I am not going to exploit, for political purposes, my opponent's youth and inexperience." Mondale himself laughed at the joke, and later admitted that Reagan had effectively neutralized the age issue:

Presidential debates 

There were two presidential debates and one vice presidential debate during the 1984 general election.

Results 

Reagan was re-elected in the November 6 election in an electoral and popular vote landslide, winning 49 states by the time the ballots were finished counting on election night at 11:34 PM in Iowa. He won a record 525 electoral votes total (of 538 possible), and received 58.8% of the popular vote; despite Ferraro's selection, 55% of women who voted did so for Reagan, and his 54 to 61% of the Catholic vote was the highest for a Republican candidate in history. Mondale's 13 electoral college votes (from his home state of Minnesota—which he won by 0.18%—and the District of Columbia) marked the lowest total of any major presidential candidate since Alf Landon's 1936 loss to Franklin D. Roosevelt.  Mondale's defeat was also the worst for any Democratic Party candidate in American history in the Electoral College (and his 13 electoral votes the fewest any Democrat has won since Stephen A. Douglas claimed 12 in the 1860 election, when the Democratic vote was divided), though others, including Alton B. Parker, James M. Cox, John W. Davis, and George S. McGovern, did worse in the popular vote. The 1984 election remains the only election since the uncontested 1820 election that any candidate of any party won every state along the Atlantic Coast.

Psephologists attributed a factor of the Republican victory to "Reagan Democrats", millions of Democrats who voted for Reagan, as in 1980. They characterized such Reagan Democrats as southern whites and northern blue-collar workers who voted for Reagan because they credited him with the economic recovery, saw Reagan as strong on national security issues, and perceived the Democrats as supporting the poor and minorities at the expense of the middle class. The Democratic National Committee commissioned a study after the election that came to these conclusions, but destroyed all copies of the final report, afraid that it would offend the party's key voters. Reagan also benefited from a near-total collapse in the third-party vote, which dropped to just 0.67% of the popular vote, its lowest level since 1964, with Bergland's campaign alone counting for over a third of this number, and none of the other third-party candidates exceeding 0.1% of the popular vote. Despite John B. Anderson's endorsement of Mondale, the majority of the people who voted for Anderson in 1980 voted for Reagan in this election, as did the majority of those who voted for Ed Clark in 1980.

When Reagan was asked in December 1984 what he wanted for Christmas he joked, "Well, Minnesota would have been nice". Reagan lost Minnesota in both this election and in 1980, making it the only state he failed to win in either election, and also making him the first two-term Republican president not to carry Minnesota, and the same feat would later be duplicated by George W. Bush who won both the 2000 and 2004 Elections without winning Minnesota either time. This is the last election where the Republican candidate achieved any of the following: Win every state in the Northeastern, Southern, and Pacific regions of the United States; win at least one county in every state; win any of the following states: Hawaii, Massachusetts, New York, Oregon, Rhode Island, and Washington; and win the following states twice: California, Connecticut, Delaware, Illinois, Maine, Maryland, Massachusetts, Michigan, New Hampshire, New Jersey, New Mexico, New York, Oregon, Pennsylvania, Vermont, Washington, and Wisconsin.

It was also the last election where the Republican nominee won Wisconsin until 2016, Iowa until 2004, West Virginia until 2000, the last election in which the winning candidate won by a double-digit margin in the percentage of the popular vote, and the last election where the winning candidate won by an eight-digit margin in total popular votes (10 million or more). Finally, despite his narrow loss in Minnesota, Reagan still won in five out of its eight congressional districts (by contrast, Nixon had only carried one Massachusetts district twelve years earlier) thus making Reagan the only U.S. presidential candidate in history to win the popular vote in a majority of congressional districts in every state. In stark contrast, Mondale became the first major-party U.S. presidential candidate since the start of popular presidential elections not to win a majority of the popular vote in even a single state (not counting Stephen A. Douglas in 1860, and William H. Taft in 1912, elections which were both complicated by strong third-party performances, plus the Democratic vote being divided between Douglas and John C. Breckinridge in 1860), having only won a plurality of 49.7% of the vote in Minnesota.

The 525 electoral votes received by Reagan – the most ever received by a nominee in one election – added to the 489 electoral votes he achieved in 1980, gave him
the most total electoral votes received by any candidate who was elected to the office of president twice (1,014), and the second largest number of electoral votes received by any candidate who was elected to the office of president behind Franklin D. Roosevelt's 1,876 total electoral votes. Reagan is also the last person to win at least one electoral vote in three different elections; the elections of 1976, 1980, and 1984.

Statistics 

Source for the popular vote:
Source for the electoral vote:

Results by state 
Sources:

Maine allowed its electoral votes to be split between candidates. Two electoral votes were awarded to the winner of the statewide race and one electoral vote to the winner of each congressional district. Reagan won all four votes.

Close states 
Margin of victory less than 1% (10 electoral votes):
 Minnesota, 0.18% (3,761 votes)

Margin of victory more than 1%, but less than 5% (17 electoral votes):
 Massachusetts, 2.79% (71,330 votes)
 Rhode Island, 3.65% (14,974 votes)

Margin of victory more than 5%, but less than 10% (90 electoral votes):
 Maryland, 5.49% (91,983 votes)
 Pennsylvania, 7.35% (356,192 votes)
 Iowa, 7.38% (97,468 votes)
 New York, 8.01% (545,154 votes)
 Wisconsin, 9.17% (202,953 votes)

Tipping point:
 Michigan, 18.99% (721,933 votes)

Counties 

Counties with highest percent of vote (Republican)
 Madison County, Idaho 92.88%
 Hansford County, Texas 89.38%
 Ochiltree County, Texas 89.15%
 Grant County, Nebraska 88.45%
 Blaine County, Nebraska 88.32%

Counties with highest percent of vote (Democratic)
 Washington, D.C. 85.38%
 Macon County, Alabama 82.71%
 Shannon County, South Dakota 81.41%
 Jefferson County, Mississippi 77.94%
 Hancock County, Georgia 76.61%

Voter demographics 

Source: CBS News and The New York Times exit poll from the Roper Center for Public Opinion Research (9,174 surveyed)

Notable expressions and phrases 
 Where's the beef?: A slogan used by Wendy's to suggest that their competitors have smaller portions of meat in their sandwiches, but used in the Democratic primaries by Mondale to criticize Gary Hart's positions as lacking substance.
 Morning in America: Slogan used by the Reagan campaign.

See also 
1984 United States Senate elections
1984 United States House of Representatives elections
1984 United States gubernatorial elections
History of the United States (1980–1991)
Second inauguration of Ronald Reagan

References

Notes

Further reading 
 Boyd, Richard W., Paul R. Mencher, Philip J. Paseltiner, Ezra Paul, Alexander S. Vanda, "The 1984 Election as Anthony Downs and Stanley Kelley Might Interpret It", Political Behavior, Vol. 10, No. 3 (Autumn, 1988), pp. 197–213.
 Goldman, Peter, et al. The quest for the presidency 1984 (1985) online
 Johnstone, Andrew, and Andrew Priest, eds.  US Presidential Elections and Foreign Policy: Candidates, Campaigns, and Global Politics from FDR to Bill Clinton (2017) pp 271–292.  online

External links 
 The Election Wall's 1984 election video page
 1984 popular vote by counties
 1984 popular vote by states
 1984 popular vote by states (with bar graphs)
 Campaign commercials from the 1984 election
 
 Election of 1984 in Counting the Votes 

 
George H. W. Bush
Presidency of Ronald Reagan
Ronald Reagan
Walter Mondale
November 1984 events in the United States
Articles containing video clips
1984 in women's history